is the seventh studio album by Chara, which was released on March 17, 1999. It debuted at #3 on the Japanese Oricon album charts, and charted in the top 200 for 9 weeks.

Chara self-produced this album. Three singles prior to this album's release: "Duca", "Hikari to Watashi" and "70% (Yūgure no Uta)". "Duca" and "Hikari to Watashi" were both released in 1998, while "70% (Yūgure no Uta)" was released a month before the album's release. "Hikari to Watashi" was used as the commercial song for Warner-Lambert Calorio diet pills in 1998. An album track, was used in Snow Brand Liebender ice-cream commercials.

Track listing

Singles

Japan Sales Rankings

References

Chara (singer) albums
1999 albums